Stefan Lövbom (born 26 July 1963) is a Swedish sports shooter. He competed in two events at the 1988 Summer Olympics.

References

External links
 

1963 births
Living people
Swedish male sport shooters
Olympic shooters of Sweden
Shooters at the 1988 Summer Olympics
People from Gävle
Sportspeople from Gävleborg County
20th-century Swedish people